Boguslaw Baniak (born 23 September 1958 in Poland), nicknamed Bebeto is a Polish football manager and former player who is currently in charge of Polish club Olimpia Grudziądz. Besides Poland, he has managed in Burkina Faso and Uzbekistan.

Career

Baniak started his managerial career with Amica Wronki. After that, he coached Stal Rzeszów, Stilon Gorzów Wielkopolski, Pogoń Szczecin, Odra Opole, Lech Poznań, Kujawiak-Zawisza, Warta Poznań, Motor Lublin, and Miedź Legnica. In 2013, he was appointed head coach of Flota Świnoujście in the Polish I liga, a position he held until 2014.

References

External links 
 Bogusław Baniak: Burkina Faso in amok 
 Football. Baniak's African son (INTERVIEW)
 INTERVIEW Bogusław Baniak: An order for commandos 
 The children slept in the street and I went to the ATM. I wanted to heal Africa 
 Bogusław Baniak: I took a lot on chest and heart

1958 births
Living people
People from Pyrzyce
Polish footballers
Association football midfielders
Pogoń Szczecin players
Polish expatriate footballers
Polish expatriate sportspeople in Greece
Expatriate footballers in Greece
Polish football managers
Polish expatriate football managers
Amica Wronki managers
Stal Rzeszów managers
Pogoń Szczecin managers
Odra Opole managers
Lech Poznań managers
Zawisza Bydgoszcz managers
Warta Poznań managers
Motor Lublin managers
Flota Świnoujście managers
Górnik Łęczna managers
Olimpia Grudziądz managers
Ekstraklasa managers
I liga managers
II liga managers